Patrick Fabiano Alves Nóbrega Luz (born 4 September 1987), commonly known as Patrick Fabiano, is a Brazilian professional footballer who plays as a striker for Brasil club União Suzano Atlético Clube. Having played for clubs in Asia since 2009, he went to represent Timor-Leste internationally in 2014 in order to be registered as an Asian player in his Asian clubs since then, despite having no connection to Timor-Leste. He was declared as ineligible to play for that national team by the Asian Football Confederation in 2017.

Club career

Youth career
Patrick Fabiano began his footballing career in 2004 with the U-16 team of São Bernardo do Campo-based club, Palestra de São Bernardo. In 2005, he moved to his home town São Paulo where he signed a one-year youth contract with one of Brazil's top most club, Guarani and thus became eligible to play for the U-17 team of the club.

Grêmio Mauaense
Patrick Fabiano began his professional footballing career in 2006 with Mauá-based Grêmio Esportivo Mauaense. He scored eight goals in 11 appearances in the 2006 Copa Paulista for the Mauá-based club.

Destroyers
He first moved out of Brazil in 2007 to Bolivia where he signed a one-year contract with Liga de Fútbol Profesional Boliviano club, Club Destroyers. He scored 19 goals in 22 appearances for the Santa Cruz de la Sierra-based club in the 2007 Liga de Fútbol Profesional Boliviano. He also made 2 appearances in the 2007 Copa Aerosur.

Blooming
In 2008, he signed a one-year contract with another Bolivian club, Club Blooming. He made 7 appearances in the 2008 Liga de Fútbol Profesional Boliviano. He also scored 3 goals in 5 appearances in the 2008 Copa Aerosur for the Santa Cruz de la Sierra-based club.

Tecos U.A.G.
In 2009, he again moved out of Brazil and this time to Mexico where he signed a short-term contract with Liga de Ascenso club, Club de Fútbol U.A.G. (now known as Estudiantes Tecos). He made his Liga de Ascenso debut and scored his first goal on 26 January 2009 in a 4-1 loss against Jaguares de Chiapas F.C. He scored 2 goals in 13 appearances in the 2009–10 Liga de Ascenso for the Guadalajara-based club.

Al-Nasr
In December 2009, he moved to the Middle East and more accurately to Kuwait where he signed a one-year contract with Kuwaiti Premier League club, Al-Nasr SC. He scored 12 goals in 17 appearances in the 2009–10 Kuwaiti Premier League, finishing one goal behind Oman's Ismail Al-Ajmi who finished as the top scorer with 13 goals. He also scored 6 goals in 5 appearances in the 2010 Kuwait Emir Cup for the Al-Farwaniyah-based club.

Al-Khaleej
In 2010, he moved to another Middle Eastern country and this time to the United Arab Emirates where he signed a two-year contract with UAE First Division League club, Al-Khaleej Club. He made his debut for the club on 26 August 2010 in a 2010–11 Etisalat Emirates Cup qualification match in a 1-0 win over Al-Fujairah SC and scored his first goal in the same competition two days later on 30 August in a 1-1 draw against Dibba Al-Hisn Sports Club. In the qualification process, he put up an eye-catching performance for the club which included a record of 5 goals in a single match on 7 October 2010 in a 7-0 win over Ras Al Khaima Club and three hat tricks, on 4 September 2010 in a 6-1 win over Armed Forces, on 6 November 2010 in a 5-0 win over Al-Dhaid and on 14 November 2011 in a 6-1 win over Al-Rams Club. He also made an appearance in the 2010–11 UAE President's Cup in Round 1 on 21 September 2010 in a 4-1 loss against Baniyas F.C. He made his UAE First Division League debut and scored his first goal in the competition on 9 December 2010 in a 3-3 draw against Emirates Club. He scored 19 goals in 17 appearances in the 2010-11 UAE First Division League, finishing as the top scorer. He also scored 24 goals in 13 appearances in the qualification to the 2010–11 Etisalat Emirates Cup.

In his second consecutive season for the club, he made his first appearance and scored his first goal for the club on 30 September 2011 in a 2011–12 Etisalat Emirates Cup qualification match in a 3-3 draw against Al-Ittihad Kalba SC. He made his first appearance in the 2011-12 UAE First Division League on 24 November 2011 in a 4-0 win over Al-Urooba. In the competition, his performance of the season was on 5 December 2011 when he scored a hat trick in a 3-3 draw against Al-Fujairah SC. He also made an appearance in the 2011–12 UAE President's Cup in Round of 16 on 18 December 2011 in a 2-1 loss against Al-Sharjah SCC. He scored 8 goals in 7 appearances in the 2011-12 UAE First Division League. He also scored 5 goals in 4 appearances in qualification to the 2011–12 Etisalat Emirates Cup.

Paranaense
In 2012, he moved back to Brazil and more accurately to Curitiba where he signed a two-year contract with Campeonato Brasileiro Série B club, Clube Atlético Paranaense. He made 2 substitute appearances for the club in the 2012 Campeonato Brasileiro Série B, one on 19 May 2012 in a 4-1 win over Joinville Esporte Clube and another on 2 June 2012 in a 3-0 win over Grêmio Barueri Futebol. He also scored 1 goal in 4 appearances in the 2012 Copa do Brasil. The goal was scored on 13 April 2012 in a 5-1 win over Criciúma Esporte Clube. He helped his team to reach the Quarter-finals of the tournament where the club lost 4-2 on aggregate to Sociedade Esportiva Palmeiras.

Hatta
In 2012, he moved back to the United Arab Emirates where he was signed by UAE First Division League club, Hatta Club on a one-year loan deal from Clube Atlético Paranaense. He scored 25 goals in 28 appearances in the 2012-13 UAE First Division League finishing as the second top scorer. He also scored 2 goals in 3 appearances in qualification to the 2012–13 Etisalat Emirates Cup.

Al-Fujairah
In 2013, he signed a one-year contract with another Emirati club, Al-Fujairah SC. He made his debut and scored his first goal for the club on 7 September 2013 in a 2013–14 UAE President's Cup qualification match in a 7-0 win over Al-Rams Club. He made his 2013-14 UAE First Division League debut on 9 November 2013 in a 1-0 loss against Al-Ittihad Kalba SC and scored his first goal in the competition on 14 September 2013 in a 2-2 draw against Hatta Club. He scored 14 goals in 22 appearances in the 2013-14 UAE First Division League, helping his team to secure the second position in the league and thus getting promoted to the UAE Arabian Gulf League. He also scored 6 goals in 8 appearances in qualification to the 2013–14 UAE President's Cup, sharing the top scorer award with Asamoah Gyan of Al-Ain FC and Grafite of Al-Ahli F.C.

Kazma

On 23 July 2014, he moved back to Kuwait where he signed a three-year contract with Kuwaiti Premier League club, Kazma SC. He made his first appearance for the club on 23 August 2014 in a 2-0 loss against Al-Arabi SC and scored his first goal in his second appearance for the club on 30 August 2014 in a 1-1 draw against 2013–14 Kuwaiti Premier League winners, Qadsia SC. On 9 December 2014, he scored the fastest goal in the history of Kuwaiti Premier League, since the league started in the 1961-1962 season. He scored the first goal of the match in a 3-0 win over Al-Yarmouk SC in just 7 seconds after the kick-off. He also made an appearance in the Quarter-finals of the 2014–15 Kuwait Emir Cup in a 3-2 loss against Al-Arabi SC. He made 5 appearances in the 2015 GCC Champions League and helped his team to reach the Semi-finals of the competition where his side lost to 2-1 Qatari side, Al-Rayyan SC. He scored 22 goals in 24 appearances in the 2014-15 Kuwaiti Premier League, finishing as the top scorer and also equaling the record of Kuwait's Hamad Al Harbi who also scored 22 goals in the 2005–06 Kuwaiti Premier League, one less than the record of 23 goals from Syrian international Omar Al Soma in the 2013–14 Kuwaiti Premier League.

He began the 2015-16 season in style as he helped his side win their first ever Kuwait Federation Cup, 2015-16 Kuwait Federation Cup with a brace in a 2-1 win over Kuwaiti giants, Kuwait SC.

Kuwait
On 27 July 2017, he signed a two-year contract with Kuwaiti giant, Kuwait SC. He made his official debut with the Kuwaiti giants on 7 September 2017 in the 2017 Kuwait Super Cup and helped his side lift the coveted trophy.

CSA
On 24 December 2018, he signed a loan of one-year contract with Centro Sportivo Alagoano, CSA.

International career
Patrick Fabiano was part of the first team squad of the Timor-Leste national football team. He was selected for the national team for the first time in 2014. He made his first appearance and scored his first goal for Timor Leste in a 2014 AFF Championship qualification match on 12 October 2014 in a 4-2 win over Brunei. He made another appearance in the tournament on 14 October 2014 in a 0-0 draw against Myanmar. His second goal for the national team came on 17 March 2015 in a 1-0 win over Mongolia in a 2018 FIFA World Cup qualification match. This goal helped them secure a 5-1 aggregate win over the Mongolians and thus helping them to advance to the 2018 FIFA World Cup qualification – AFC Second Round. He has made appearances in the 2014 AFF Championship qualification and an appearance in the 2018 FIFA World Cup qualification (AFC).

On 19 January 2017, the Asian Football Confederation declared Patrick Fabiano and eleven other Brazilian footballers ineligible to represent East Timor.

Personal life
On 18 June 2013, he received an East Timorese passport and hence he shares dual-citizenship between Brazil and Timor-Leste. However, the Asian Football Confederation found four years later that he had a falsified Timorese birth or baptismal certificate.

Career statistics

Club

International goals
Scores and results list East Timor's goal tally first, score column indicates score after each Patrick goal.

Honours
Kazma SC
 Kuwait Federation Cup: 2015–16

Kuwait SC
 Kuwait Super Cup: 2017

Individual
 KPL Golden Boot: 2014–15,  2016–17
 Kazma SC top scorer: 2014–15, 2015–16, 2016-17

References

External links

Patrick Fabiano - EUROSPORT
Patrick Fabiano - SOCCER PUNTER
Patrick Fabiano - KOOORA
Patrick Fabiano - fanet.ae

1987 births
Living people
Footballers from São Paulo
Brazilian footballers
Association football forwards
Club Destroyers players
Club Blooming players
Tecos F.C. footballers
Al-Nasr SC (Kuwait) players
Club Athletico Paranaense players
Hatta Club players
Fujairah FC players
Kazma SC players
Kuwait SC players
Khor Fakkan Sports Club players
UAE First Division League players
UAE Pro League players
Bolivian Primera División players
Brazilian expatriate footballers
Brazilian expatriate sportspeople in Bolivia
Expatriate footballers in Bolivia
Brazilian expatriate sportspeople in Mexico
Expatriate footballers in Mexico
Brazilian expatriate sportspeople in Kuwait
Expatriate footballers in Kuwait
Brazilian expatriate sportspeople in the United Arab Emirates
Expatriate footballers in the United Arab Emirates
Brazilian expatriate sportspeople in Qatar
Expatriate footballers in Qatar

East Timorese footballers
Timor-Leste international footballers
Al Salmiya SC players
Kuwait Premier League players